Beachley Barracks is a British Army base at Beachley in Gloucestershire, England, close to the England–Wales border at Chepstow. The Barracks is located at Beachley Point between the River Severn and the River Wye. It is the home of 1st Battalion, The Rifles.

History
In 1915, during the First World War, the government requisitioned a large area of land at Beachley and constructed National Shipyard No.2. However, the war ended before production had begun. Instead, in 1924 it was decided to establish a British Army Apprentices School (which in 1966 was renamed as an Army Apprentices College) at Beachley to ensure a core of technical qualified soldiers with technical education combined with military training as potential NCOs and officers mainly for the specialist corps Royal Engineers, REME Plant Operator mechanics and RAOC.

In November 2016 the Ministry of Defence announced that the site would close in 2027; this was later extended to 2029.

Current units
Only one unit is currently stationed at the barracks:
1st Battalion, The Rifles

References

External links
 Army Apprentices College and Beachley Old Boys Association

Installations of the British Army
Barracks in England
Buildings and structures in Gloucestershire
Tidenham